Paradou AC, an Algerian professional association football club, has gained entry to Confederation of African Football (CAF) competitions on several occasions. They have represented Algeria in the Confederation Cup on one occasion.

History
Paradou AC whose team has regularly taken part in Confederation of African Football (CAF) competitions. Qualification for Algerian clubs is determined by a team's performance in its domestic league and cup competitions. The first continental participation was in 2019–20 season in the CAF Confederation Cup. The first continental match was against CI Kamsar of Guinea and ended with a 3–0 victory and the first goal scored by Abdelkader Ghorab. Paradou AC has reached the group stage in Group D with FC San Pédro, Hassania Agadir and Enyimba and finished third.

CAF competitions

Statistics

By season
Information correct as of 2 February 2020.
Key

Pld = Played
W = Games won
D = Games drawn
L = Games lost
F = Goals for
A = Goals against
Grp = Group stage

PR = Preliminary round
R1 = First round
R2 = Second round
SR16 = Second Round of 16
R16 = Round of 16
QF = Quarter-final
SF = Semi-final

Key to colours and symbols:

Overall record

In Africa
:

Statistics by country
Statistics correct as of game against Hassania Agadir on February 2, 2020

CAF competitions

African competitions goals
Statistics correct as of game against Hassania Agadir on February 2, 2020

Two goals one match

List of All-time appearances
This List of All-time appearances for Paradou AC in African competitions contains football players who have played for Paradou AC in African football competitions and have managed to accrue 10 or more appearances. As well as participating in UAFA Club Championship for those who have exceeded the limit of 10 African matches only.

Gold Still playing competitive football in Paradou AC.

African and arab opponents by cities

References

Africa
Algerian football clubs in international competitions